Bulnes may refer to:

People
 Eduardo Pérez Bulnes (1785–1851), Argentine statesman
 Francisco Bulnes (politician) (1847–1924), Mexican intellectual
 Manuel Bulnes (1799–1866), Chilean military and political figure
 Manuel Bulnes Pinto (1842–1899), Chilean military and political figure

Places and structures
 Bulnes (Buenos Aires Underground), a station in Argentina
 Bulnes (Cabrales), a parish in Asturias, Spain
 Bulnes, Chile, a city and commune in Ñuble Region, Chile
 Bulnes, England, historical name of the town of Bowness-on-Windermere

See also
 Fuerte Bulnes, a fort in Patagonia, Chile
 Juan Francisco Bulnes, a municipality in Honduras
 Naranjo de Bulnes, a limestone peak in Asturias, Spain